The Police Commissioner is a 1962 Italian comedy film directed by Luigi Comencini.

Cast
Alberto Sordi as Vice Commissioner Dante Lombardozzi 
Franca Tamantini as Marisa Santarelli 
Alessandro Cutolo as Police Commissioner
Alfredo Leggi as Armando Provetti 
Mino Doro as Colonel Menotti Di Pietro 
Franco Scandurra as Matarazzo 
Aldo Bufi Landi as Ettore Gargiulo 
Angela Portaluri as Maria De Santis  
Carlo Bagno as Dr. Longo  
 Ennio Balbo as The Guest Speaker

References

External links

1962 films
1962 comedy films
Italian comedy films
Films directed by Luigi Comencini
Films scored by Carlo Rustichelli
Commedia all'italiana
Films with screenplays by Age & Scarpelli
1960s Italian-language films
1960s Italian films